Other People's Money is a 1991 American romantic comedy-drama film directed by Norman Jewison, starring Danny DeVito, Gregory Peck and Penelope Ann Miller. It was adapted by screenwriter Alvin Sargent from the 1989 play of the same name by Jerry Sterner.

The minor film is mostly notable as Gregory Peck's last major screen performance.

Plot
Lawrence "Larry the Liquidator" Garfield (Danny DeVito) is a successful corporate raider who has become rich buying up companies and selling off their assets. With the help of a computerized stock analyzing program called "Carmen", Garfield has identified New England Wire & Cable Company as his next target. The struggling company is run by the benevolent and folksy Andrew "Jorgy" Jorgenson (Gregory Peck) and is the primary employer in its small Rhode Island town in New England.

Garfield decides to take over the company. After Jorgy learns that he has filed a Schedule 13D report, and after stubbornly insisting that no outsider can seize control of a business his father began, Jorgy is finally persuaded to hire his stepdaughter Kate (Penelope Ann Miller), a big-city lawyer, to defend against a hostile takeover. Garfield is instantly smitten with the beautiful Kate, although he is on to her tactics and does not waver from his goal of becoming the majority stockholder of New England Wire & Cable. Garfield tactlessly and unsuccessfully tries to seduce her. Despite their antagonism, Kate finds herself attracted to Garfield's bold nature.

The takeover attempt begins to fracture the New England Wire & Cable Company family. Kate's mother Bea (Piper Laurie) secretly travels to Garfield's offices to offer one million dollars in greenmail to Garfield if he'll go away, but he refuses, stating, "I don't take money from widows or orphans". Trusted company president Bill Coles (Dean Jones), fearful that the takeover will leave him with nothing, offers to let Garfield vote his shares in the company in exchange for a million-dollar payout. Garfield agrees, but specifies that Coles will get only half as much if his shares fail to make up the margin of victory.

Garfield concedes to Jorgy's offer to let the matter be settled at the annual shareholder's meeting. Relying on the support of longtime friends and investors, Jorgy makes an impassioned plea to save the company, appealing to the traditions of manufacturing as opposed to the new breed of capitalism which Larry the Liquidator represents, in which buyers of companies create no products or jobs and are interested only in money. The shareholders seem swayed by Jorgy's speech and boo Garfield when he gets up to give a rebuttal.

In his rebuttal, Garfield compares New England Wire & Cable to the last buggy whip manufacturer, arguing that even though the company's product may be high quality, changing technology has rendered it obsolete. Rather than running a failing business into the ground, he contends that the shareholders should follow his lead and get what value they can from the stock before the company's inevitable demise. At least when this company is liquidated, he says, they'll end up with a few dollars in their pocket.

When the vote is taken, the shareholders agree to give Garfield controlling interest in the company. The margin of victory is greater than Coles' shares and thus he does not receive the full amount he betrayed Jorgy to get.

Back at home in Manhattan, Garfield finds himself uncharacteristically despondent after his victory, having realized he has lost his chance for a romance with Kate. Just then, Kate calls. She's been having discussions with a Japanese automaker that wants to hire New England Wire & Cable to manufacture stainless steel wire cloth for making automobile airbags, something which will make the company profitable again on a new expanding industrial product. An excited Garfield invites her to dinner to discuss it. Kate tells him lunch, “strictly business, you know where”. Garfield blushes and smiles at this.

Cast
Danny DeVito as Lawrence ("Larry the Liquidator") Garfield
Gregory Peck as Andrew ("Jorgy") Jorgenson
Penelope Ann Miller as Kate Sullivan
Piper Laurie as Bea Sullivan
Dean Jones as Bill Coles
R. D. Call as Arthur
Mo Gaffney as Harriet
Tom Aldredge as Ozzie

Production
The film was mainly shot in New York City. During the opening credits, the original 7 World Trade Center lobby can be seen. Some of the scenes that take place inside the factory were shot in the now defunct "Seymour Specialty and Wire" in Seymour, Connecticut. Other scenes were shot in the (also defunct) Gilbert and Bennett mill in Georgetown, Connecticut.

Reception
The film received mixed to negative reviews, with a 31% rating on review aggregate Rotten Tomatoes based on 16 reviews. Roger Ebert of The Chicago Sun-Times gave the film 3.5 out of 4 stars, but said 'I didn't like the very last scene of “Other People’s Money.” It felt tacked on, manufactured, concocted out of a Hollywood studio's knee-jerk need to provide a smileyface ending that was not in the spirit of the film'. Janet Maslin of The New York Times said of Sargent's adaptation, 'culminates in a speechy but effective debate about the merits of old-fashioned business versus the corporate takeover,' but still felt that the film was 'too genial to be hard-hitting.'

References

External links

 
 
 
 
 

1991 films
1991 comedy-drama films
American business films
American comedy-drama films
Trading films
Films directed by Norman Jewison
American films based on plays
Warner Bros. films
Films set in Rhode Island
Films shot in Connecticut
Corporate raiders
Wall Street films
Films scored by David Newman
Films with screenplays by Alvin Sargent
1990s English-language films
1990s American films